Doo wop or doo-wop is a vocal-based rhythm and blues music style. It may also refer to:

"Doo Wop (That Thing)", a 1998 song by Lauryn Hill
Doo Wop (film), a 2004 French film
Googie architecture, also known as doo wop, a form of novelty futuristic architecture

See also
"Doo-Whop" (Whigfield song), released in 2000